Ian Jason (born 18 January 1997) is a French rugby sevens player. She was part of French sevens team that won a bronze medal at the 2022 Rugby World Cup Sevens in Cape Town.

References 

Living people
1997 births
French rugby sevens players
France international women's rugby sevens players